Carmi is a city in and the county seat of White County, Illinois, United States, along the Little Wabash River, where the population was 5,240 at the 2010 census.

History
Carmi post office has been in operation since 1817, and then a WPA oil on canvas mural called Service to the Farmer by Davenport Griffen was first displayed there in 1939. Carmi is a biblical name.

Geography

Demographics

As of the census of 2000, there were 5,422 people, 2,390 households, and 1,477 families residing in the city. The racial makeup of the city was 98.30% White, 0.48% African American, 0.35% Native American, 0.24% Asian, 0.06% from other races, and 0.57% from two or more races. Hispanic or Latino of any race were 0.65% of the population.

There were 2,390 households, out of which 23.8% had children under the age of 18 living with them, 49.7% were married couples living together, 9.2% had a female householder with no husband present, and 38.2% were non-families. 35.3% of all households were made up of individuals, and 20.3% had someone living alone who was 65 years of age or older. The average household size was 2.16 and the average family size was 2.78.

In the city, the population was spread out, with 20.4% under the age of 18, 8.2% from 18 to 24, 23.7% from 25 to 44, 21.7% from 45 to 64, and 25.9% who were 65 years of age or older. The median age was 43 years. For every 100 females, there were 84.4 males. For every 100 females age 18 and over, there were 81.7 males.

The median income for a household in the city was $25,667, and the median income for a family was $32,456. Males had a median income of $30,735 versus $16,693 for females. The per capita income for the city was $15,886. About 11.7% of families and 15.1% of the population were below the poverty line, including 21.4% of those under age 18 and 11.6% of those age 65 or over.

Education

College
 Southeastern Illinois College David L. Stanley White County Center

Public
 County Community School District #5:
 Carmi-White County High School - grades 7-12
 Carmi-White County Middle School - grades 4-6
 Jefferson Attendance Center - grades 2-3
 Lincoln Attendance Center - grades K-1

Private
Carmi Christian School

Media

Radio
 WRUL 97.3 FM 
 WROY 1460 AM

Print
 Carmi Times
 Carmi Chronicle

Notable people 

 King Brockett, professional baseball player
 Orlando Burrell, White County judge, White County Sheriff, congressman
 Roy Clippinger, congressman
 Everton Conger, Union Army Lieutenant colonel (Civil War), federal territorial judge, involved in manhunt for John Wilkes Booth
 Caswell J. Crebs, Illinois Supreme Court justice
 John M. Crebs, Union Army Lieutenant colonel (Civil War), congressman
 Josh Elder, comic book creator (Mail Order Ninja, StarCraft: Frontline)
 Ivan A. Elliott, Illinois Attorney General
 Frederick J. Karch, Brigadier General with the U.S. Marine Corps (World War II, Vietnam)
 Samuel D. Lockwood, Illinois Attorney General, Illinois Secretary of State, Illinois Supreme Court justice
 Glenn Poshard, state senator, congressman, Illinois Gubernatorial Candidate, and president of Southern Illinois University
 Sandy Rios, talk show host and Fox News Channel contributor
 John McCracken Robinson, senator, Illinois Supreme Court justice
 Run Kid Run, Christian band
 Side Walk Slam, punk rock band
 Charles Peyton, AKA Jeff Stryker, Actor, adult film actor, AVN Award Hall of Fame inductee Hustler Hall of Fame, RuPaul Lifetime Achievement Award, Major motion picture Star, fashion model
 James R. Williams, congressman
 William Wilson, Chief Justice of the Illinois Supreme Court

See also
 Little Egypt
 Erie Canal Soda Pop Festival
 Carmi Air Force Station

References
https://web.archive.org/web/20070219105246/http://home.midwest.net/~cbconly/carmi.htm

Cities in Illinois
Cities in White County, Illinois
County seats in Illinois
Populated places established in 1816
1816 establishments in Illinois Territory